Saint Erasmus (transliterated) Sveti Erazmo) is an ancient Christian basilica and necropolis located near Ohrid, North Macedonia, along the Ohrid-Struga freeway. Archaeological excavations have uncovered a three-part basilica and a necropolis with 124 graves dating from the 6th and 12th centuries.

External links
 Information on Sveti Erazmo

Archaeological sites in North Macedonia
Ohrid Municipality
Medieval churches of Ohrid